Xyleutes striata is a moth in the family Cossidae. It is found in Colombia.

References

Xyleutes
Moths described in 1901